Devnya Valley (Devnenska Dolina \'dev-nen-ska do-li-'na\) is 2.5-km long and 700 m wide valley and is situated between the north slopes of Great Needle Peak (Falsa Aguja Peak) and Helmet Peak in Levski Ridge, Tangra Mountains on Livingston Island in the South Shetland Islands. The valley holds a side tributary of Huron Glacier.  It is named after the town of Devnya in Northeastern Bulgaria.

Location

Maps
 L.L. Ivanov et al. Antarctica: Livingston Island and Greenwich Island, South Shetland Islands. Scale 1:100000 topographic map. Sofia: Antarctic Place-names Commission of Bulgaria, 2005.
 L.L. Ivanov. Antarctica: Livingston Island and Greenwich, Robert, Snow and Smith Islands. Scale 1:120000 topographic map.  Troyan: Manfred Wörner Foundation, 2009.

References
 Devnya Valley. SCAR Composite Gazetteer of Antarctica
 Bulgarian Antarctic Gazetteer. Antarctic Place-names Commission. (details in Bulgarian, basic data in English)

Tangra Mountains